Science fiction and fantasy in the Serbia has a long and varied history.

History 
As far back as the end of the 18th century, science fiction elements can be found in Serbian literature, but its  modern period foundation is considered to commence with "Posle milijon godina" (After Million of Years), written by Dragutin Ilić in 1889, which is also considered the first science fiction theatrical play in the history of the world literature. Lazar Komarčić's novel "Jedna ugašena zvezda" (An Extinct Star) followed, with publication in 1902.

Today, Zoran Živković (writer), winner of the World Fantasy Award, is considered one of the best-known Serbian science fiction authors, and perhaps the best known.

Serbian science fiction and fantasy writers

Artists 
 Marko Đurđević
 Aleksa Gajić
 Borivoje Grbić
 Branislav Kerac
 Dražen Kovačević
 Zoran Janjetov
 Željko Pahek
 Darko Perović
 Vujadin Radovanović
 Rade Tovladijac
 Zoran Tucić
 Dobrosav Bob Živković

Societies 
Photon Tide (http://www.photontide.org)
SF Team (http://www.sftim.com)
Lazar Komarčić (http://www.lazarkomarcic.org.yu)
KONEF (http://www.konef.org.yu)
Sci&Fi (http://www.sciencefiction.org.rs)
Serbian Society for Science Fiction (http://www.sciencefiction.org.rs)

Notes

See also
Yugoslav science fiction